Hubert Loutsch (18 November 1878 – 24 June 1946) was a Luxembourgish politician. He was the tenth Prime Minister of Luxembourg, serving for 16 weeks from 6 November 1915 until 24 February 1916.

Loutsch was a lawyer by profession. On 6 November 1915 he was appointed prime minister, and Director-General (Minister) for Foreign Affairs. The Loutsch Ministry consisted only of members of the Right Party, but the Left had a majority in the Chamber of Deputies. Thereafter, Grand Duchess Marie-Adélaïde dissolved the legislature and ordered new elections to be held on 23 December 1915. The new Chamber, however, also did not give the Right Party a majority. On 11 January 1916 the Loutsch government lost a confidence vote, and Loutsch was succeeded by Victor Thorn on 24 February 1916.

From 1920 to 1934 he was president of the insurance company La Luxembourgeoise. From 1925 to 1934 he was a Deputy in the Chamber for the Union nationale indépendante. 

He died in 1946 in Brussels.

References 

|-

Prime Ministers of Luxembourg
Ministers for Foreign Affairs of Luxembourg
20th-century Luxembourgian lawyers
Luxembourgian people of World War I
1878 births
1946 deaths
People from Mondercange